Trennt Michaud (born August 22, 1996) is a Canadian pair skater. With his skating partner, Lia Pereira, he is the 2022 CS Golden Spin of Zagreb bronze medallist and 2023 Canadian national bronze medallist.

With his former skating partner, Evelyn Walsh, he is the 2022 Four Continents bronze medallist and a three-time Canadian national silver medallist. Walsh/Michaud also won the 2017 Canadian national junior title and competed at two World Junior Championships, achieving their highest placement, fifth, in 2017.

Personal life 
Michaud was born on August 22, 1996, in Belleville, Ontario, Canada.

Career

Early career 
Michaud started learning to skate in 2004. He competed on the novice level at the 2013 Canadian Championships, placing eighth in men's singles and second in pairs with Judith Murtha-Anderson where they were coached by Lisa Conley and represented the Prince Edward County Skating Club.

His partnership with Hope McLean began in 2014. They won the junior pairs' title at the 2016 Canadian Championships and were sent to the 2016 World Junior Championships in Debrecen, Hungary. They withdrew from Junior Worlds after placing thirteenth in the short program. They were coached by Alison Purkiss and Scott Rachuk in London and Komoka, Ontario.

Partnership with Walsh

2016–17 season
In 2016, Michaud teamed up with Evelyn Walsh, coached by Alison Purkiss and Margaret Purdy in London, Ontario. Making their international debut, they placed eleventh at a Junior Grand Prix (JGP) competition held in late September in Tallinn, Estonia, and fifth the following month at a JGP event in Dresden, Germany. In January 2017, they won the junior pairs' title at the Canadian Championships and were named in Canada's team to the 2017 World Junior Championships in Taipei. Competing in Taiwan, they placed sixth in the short program, fifth in the free skate, and fifth overall.

2017–18 season
In the 2017–2018 season, Walsh and Michaud participated in two events on the Junior Grand Prix circuit, winning the bronze medal at JGP Riga Cup and placing fourth at JGP Croatia Cup.

Competing as a senior pair at the 2018 Canadian Championships, they placed fifth overall. At the 2018 World Junior Championships, the pair placed fifth in the short program, sixth in the free skate, and sixth overall.

2018–19 season
Competing as seniors internationally in the 2018-19 season, Walsh/Michaud made their debut on the Challenger series at the Nebelhorn Trophy, where they placed seventh.  For the Grand Prix series, Walsh and Michaud were initially assigned to 2018 Skate Canada International and subsequently added to the 2018 Skate America event following the withdrawal of the Chinese team of Li/Xie.  They placed eighth at Skate America, following rough programs where Walsh fell five times, but fared better at Skate Canada International, finishing in fifth place.

At the 2019 Canadian Championships, Walsh/Michaud placed second in both programs, winning the silver medal behind Moore-Towers/Marinaro.  Walsh, commenting on their struggles at their first two competitions that season, said, "we do truly believe everything happens for a reason."  Michaud remarked that their expectations had changed considerably from the previous season when they were happy to finish fifth.  They were assigned, alongside Moore-Towers/Marinaro, to compete at the Four Continents and World Championships.

Competing at Four Continents, they were in sixth place after the short program but fell to seventh overall after finishing eighth in the free skate with a performance that included an aborted lift.  At the World Championships, they placed twelfth.

2019–20 season
For their free program, Walsh/Michaud worked with retired Canadian pairs champion Eric Radford as choreographer.  Walsh/Michaud made their debut at the 2019 CS Finlandia Trophy, where they placed sixth.  At the 2019 Skate Canada International, their first Grand Prix assignment, they were eighth.  At the 2019 Rostelecom Cup, they were fifth in the short program with a new personal best.  Seventh in the free skate, they were sixth overall.

Following the conclusion of the Grand Prix series, Walsh and Michaud consulted with 2014 Olympic pairs champion Maxim Trankov to improve pair elements, in particular their triple twist lift.  Skating at the 2020 Canadian Championships, they placed third in the short program, less than a point behind second-place Ilyushechkina/Bilodeau.  Second in the free skate despite some under rotations on their jumps, they won their second consecutive national silver medal.  Walsh called it"the peak, I think, of our season so far, and this is exactly where we wanted to be at this point."

Walsh/Michaud placed sixth at the 2020 Four Continents Championships, again ahead of Ilyushechkina/Bilodeau.  Consequently, they were afterwards assigned to Canada's second pairs berth at the 2020 World Championships in Montreal.  However, the championships were cancelled as a result of the coronavirus pandemic.

2020–21 season 
After the initial lockdowns, Walsh and Michaud were among the elite athletes who were cleared to train through future lockdowns. Walsh/Michaud were assigned to the 2020 Skate Canada International, but this event was also cancelled as a result of the pandemic.  The team was scheduled to participate in the virtual Skate Canada Challenge in December, but Walsh sprained her ankle and was off the ice for two weeks, causing them to miss the filming period.

Despite this, on February 25th, Walsh and Michaud were announced as part of the Canadian team to the 2021 World Championships in Stockholm. They placed twelfth at the World Championships.

2021–22 season 
Walsh/Michaud's outlook heading into the Olympic season was complicated by the decision of their erstwhile choreographer, former World champion Eric Radford, to return to competition alongside new partner Vanessa James. With only two Canadian pairs berths available for the 2022 Winter Olympics, there was projected to be a fight amongst the top three Canadian teams. Walsh said, "anyone can come back into a sport. It's nothing against them. At the same time, we feel we're in a position to earn that Olympic spot, and that's what we’re chasing this year."

The team was scheduled to debut competitively at the 2021 CS Autumn Classic International but withdrew after Walsh came down with a chest infection that required two courses of antibiotics as treatment.  At their first Grand Prix, 2021 Skate America, they placed eighth of eight teams. They were sixth of seven teams at the 2021 NHK Trophy, their second assignment.

At the 2022 Canadian Championships, Walsh/Michaud greatly improved on their performances earlier in the season and took the silver medal with second-place finishes in both segments. With Moore-Towers/Marinaro taking the gold medal, it was perceived that the choice for the second berth on the Canadian Olympic team would come down to Walsh/Michaud or James/Radford. The latter had withdrawn from the championships after placing fourth in the short program, having had limited training in the preceding weeks due to both skaters having COVID-19. The following day, the Canadian federation named James/Radford to the second spot. This choice was controversial, with many arguing that Walsh/Michaud had earned the assignment.

Walsh/Michaud were assigned to compete at the 2022 Four Continents Championships in Tallinn, where they placed second in the short program, taking a silver small medal. They dropped to third place in the free skate after jump and lift errors, winning the bronze medal overall. Michaud said afterwards that they had "been skating so well and training so well, and we're just disappointed that we couldn't fully show all of that today."

While the team's season was originally meant to be over, longtime training partners Moore-Towers/Marinaro withdrew from the 2022 World Championships due to Moore-Towers' mental health, and first alternates Walsh/Michaud were activated. As a result of the Russian invasion of Ukraine, the International Skating Union banned all Russian and Belarusian skaters from competing at the World Championships. As well, the Chinese Skating Association opted not to send athletes to compete in Montpellier. As those countries' athletes comprised the entirety of the top five pairs at the Olympics, this greatly impacted the field. Walsh/Michaud placed eighth in the short program, sixth in the free skate, and sixth overall. Their placement, combined with the bronze medal for James/Radford, earned Canada three spots at the next year's championships.

End of partnership
Walsh and Michaud had been assigned to compete on the Grand Prix for the 2022–23 season, but on August 5, it was announced that she had decided to retire and focus on her university studies, while Michaud would seek to carry on with a new partner.

Partnership with Pereira

2022–23 season 
Following a search, Michaud formed a new partnership with singles skater Lia Pereira. They made their competitive debut at the Skate Ontario sectional qualifier in November, winning the gold medal. Pereira/Michaud went on to win the final national qualifying event, Skate Canada Challenge. Pereira said afterwards that they were "just growing together, and each competition is a new learning experience." Shortly after that, they were assigned to make their international debut at the 2022 CS Golden Spin of Zagreb. Fourth after the short program, they rose to third place in the free skate, winning the bronze medal and securing the international minimum scores to compete at future ISU championships.

Pereira/Michaud attended their first Canadian Championships, an event that was noteworthy as Pereira opted to continue competing in the women's event as well. They placed fourth in the short program, 1.01 points back of third-place Laurin/Éthier. They rose to third place after the free skate, winning the bronze medal, despite Michaud making errors on both of his jumping passes. He said he was "a little upset with myself" for those mistakes, but added there were still "lots of positive outcomes." They were named to the Canadian teams for both the 2023 Four Continents and World championships.

At the Four Continents Championships in Colorado Springs, Pereira/Michaud placed fourth in the short program with a clean skate. They were fourth in the free skate as well, the only error being Michaud doubling their planned triple Salchow. They both indicated that they were pleased with how the competition had gone, as they continued to gain experience.

In media
Walsh and Michaud worked on the Netflix series Spinning Out, serving as skating doubles for leads Kaya Scodelario and Evan Roderick.

Programs

With Pereira 

|}

With Walsh

With McLean

Competitive highlights 
CS: Challenger Series; GP: Grand Prix; JGP: Junior Grand Prix

Pairs with Pereira

Pairs with Walsh

Pairs with McLean

Pairs with Murtha-Anderson

Men's singles

References

External links 
 
 
 

1996 births
Canadian male pair skaters
Living people
Sportspeople from Belleville, Ontario
Four Continents Figure Skating Championships medalists